Stephen J. Ketteridge (born 7 November 1959 in Stevenage, Hertfordshire) is an English former professional footballer who played in the Football League, as a midfielder.

References

External links

1959 births
Living people
People from Stevenage
English footballers
Association football midfielders
Wimbledon F.C. players
Crystal Palace F.C. players
Leyton Orient F.C. players
Cardiff City F.C. players
Barnet F.C. players
Aylesbury United F.C. players
St Albans City F.C. players
Chesham United F.C. players
English Football League players
National League (English football) players